Thomas John Wood (September 25, 1823 – February 26, 1906) was a career United States Army officer. He served in the Mexican–American War and as a Union general during the American Civil War.

During the Mexican–American War, Wood served on the staff of General Zachary Taylor, and later joined the 2nd Dragoons. During the Civil War, he participated in many battles in the Western Theater. Wood commanded a division at the Battle of Chickamauga in September 1863, during which time he chose to obey a questionable order from commanding general William S. Rosecrans to reposition his division. In doing so, Wood opened a gap in the Union lines, which contributed to the vanquishing of the Federal forces in the battle and their subsequent retreat. Wood and his division took part in the successful Union assault during the Battle of Missionary Ridge in November during the Chattanooga Campaign. He also commanded the IV Corps of the Army of the Cumberland during the Battle of Nashville in December 1864.

Early life and career
Wood was born in rural Munfordville, Kentucky, the son of George Twyman Wood, an army officer, and Elizabeth Helm (through his mother, he was a cousin of Confederate general Benjamin H. Helm). He was an 1845 graduate of the United States Military Academy, finishing 5th in a class of 41 cadets. He was commissioned as a second lieutenant in the United States Army Corps of Engineers.

In 1846, Wood joined General Zachary Taylor's staff for a few months as the Mexican–American War erupted. He soon transferred at his request to U.S. 2nd Dragoons and was cited for valor at the Battle of Buena Vista in February 1847. After the war, he served in a succession of cavalry postings on the open frontier in the American Old West. Wood traveled in Europe from 1859 until early 1861 on a leave of absence from the army.

Civil War service
During early days of the Civil War, Wood helped organize, train, and equip several volunteer regiments in Indiana. In October 1861, he was promoted to brigadier general of Indiana volunteers. The following month, he married Caroline E. Greer of Dayton, Ohio.

Wood commanded a brigade in the Tennessee and Mississippi campaigns at the beginning of the war. He commanded a division in the Army of the Ohio, then in the Army of the Cumberland. Wood was present at the second day of the Battle of Shiloh. Wood was wounded during the Battle of Murfreesboro in December 1862. He suffered controversy at the Battle of Chickamauga, where he was blamed for contributing to William S. Rosecrans's defeat.  On September 20, 1863, a breakdown in situational awareness by Rosecrans and poor staff work resulted in Wood receiving a seemingly senseless order that, if literally obeyed, required him to pull his division out of the line to the support of another division further to his left, dangerously creating an unprotected gap in the right of the line. Instead of verifying his commander's actual intent, Wood elected to regard the order as imperative and moved his division out of its position.

Historian Peter Cozzens wrote:

Less than 30 minutes after Wood moved his division, Confederate Lt. Gen. James Longstreet's men poured through the resulting gap and cut Rosecrans's army in two. Rosecrans was eventually relieved from command of the Army of the Cumberland following this Union defeat, while Wood retained his division.

Cozzens finds fault with Wood "for letting petty bitterness get the better of him" and Rosecrans for "not checking the order to make sure it reflected his intent. Rosey was tired and it showed."

Wood redeemed himself during the successful assault on Missionary Ridge in November and at the Battle of Lovejoy's Station on August 20, 1864, where despite a badly shattered leg, he stayed on the field encouraging his men. At Missionary Ridge, Wood's division was the first division to reach the rebel positions atop the heights and the first division to drive defenders from their fortifications.

He commanded the IV Corps of the Army of the Cumberland at the Battle of Nashville, and pursued John Bell Hood's Confederates after the Union victory. President Abraham Lincoln appointed Wood to the grade of major general of volunteers on February 22, 1865, to rank from January 27, 1865. On February 14, 1865, the U.S. Senate had confirmed the President's January 30, 1865 nomination of Wood's appointment. Wood was mustered out of the volunteers on September 1, 1866.

Postbellum career
After the Confederates surrendered, Wood was assigned to duty in Mississippi with the occupation army. Frustrated with administrative duty with the Freedmen's Bureau and the politics of Reconstruction, he retired from the service in June 1868, having achieved the same rank in the regular army. His old war wounds prevented him from achieving his desire of returning to active duty on the frontier.

He moved to Dayton and became active in the Grand Army of the Republic, a social organization for Union Army veterans. He also served as a member of the board of visitors at the Military Academy and was a companion of the Military Order of the Loyal Legion of the United States. In 1892 he became a Veteran Member of the Aztec Club of 1847.

When he died in 1906, Wood was the last survivor of his West Point class.

See also

 List of American Civil War generals (Union)

Notes

References
 
 Eicher, John H., and David J. Eicher, Civil War High Commands. Stanford: Stanford University Press, 2001. .

External links
 

1823 births
1906 deaths
Politicians from Dayton, Ohio
Union Army generals
People of Kentucky in the American Civil War
People of Ohio in the American Civil War
United States Military Academy alumni
People from Munfordville, Kentucky
American military personnel of the Mexican–American War
Members of the Aztec Club of 1847
Burials at West Point Cemetery
Indiana Democrats
19th-century American politicians